Cobra is a roller coaster located at PowerPark in Alahärmä, Finland. Cobra was the first Vekoma Boomerang to use the new MK1211 open sided train.

Roller coasters in Finland
Roller coasters introduced in 2005
Kauhava